Arlene Watkins (born 1989) is a camogie player and student. She won a Soaring Star award in 2009 and won a 2009 All Ireland junior camogie medal. Arlene has played with the county since 2005 and won two Purcell Cup medals with Athlone I.T. in 2007 and 2009. Was also honoured as Senior camogie player of the year in 2009.

References

External links 
 Official Camogie Website
 Offaly Camogie website
 Review of 2009 championship in On The Ball Official Camogie Magazine
 Video Highlights of 2009 All Ireland Junior Final
 Report of Offaly v Waterford 2009 All Ireland junior final in Irish Times Independent, Examiner and Offaly Express.
 Video highlights of 2009 championship Part One and part two

1989 births
Living people
Offaly camogie players